Department of Cooperatives is a Bangladesh government Department under the Ministry of Local Government, Rural Development and Co-operatives responsible for reducing poverty through cooperatives. It also responsible for regulating cooperatives, quasi-judicial services, and providing training to them. It also provides finance for cooperatives. Md. Abdul Majid is the Registrar and Director General of the department.

History
The Department of Cooperatives investigated Destiny Group in 2013 and found the cooperative has misappropriated 1.4 billion taka.

References

1972 establishments in Bangladesh
Organisations based in Dhaka
Government agencies of Bangladesh
Government departments of Bangladesh